Nový Jimramov is a municipality and village in Žďár nad Sázavou District in the Vysočina Region of the Czech Republic. It has about 60 inhabitants.

Administrative parts
The village of Jimramovské Paseky and the hamlet of Široké Pole are administrative parts of Nový Jimramov.

References

Villages in Žďár nad Sázavou District